Humboldt Peak may refer to:

Humboldt Peak (California), in California, United States, near Butte County High Point, California
Humboldt Peak (Colorado), in Colorado, United States
Humboldt Peak (Nevada), in Nevada, United States
Pico Humboldt, a peak in Venezuela

See also
 Humboldt (disambiguation)